Marinobufagenin (marinobufagin) is a cardiotonic bufadienolide steroid. It can be found in the plasma and urine of human subjects with myocardial infarction, kidney failure, and heart failure. It is also secreted by the toad Bufo rubescens and other related species such as Bufo marinus. It is a vasoconstrictor with effects similar to digitalis.

References

Vertebrate toxins
Epoxides
Bufanolides
Diols